James Emmett Madison Holt (July 25, 1894 – February 2, 1961) was an American Major League Baseball infielder. He played for the Philadelphia Athletics during the  season.

References

Major League Baseball infielders
Philadelphia Athletics players
Baseball players from Tennessee
1894 births
1961 deaths
People from Dayton, Tennessee
Nashville Vols players